Yasuhiro is a masculine Japanese given name.

Possible writings
Yasuhiro can be written using many different combinations of kanji characters. Here are some examples:

康弘, "healthy, vast"
康広, "healthy, wide"
康寛, "healthy, generosity"
康裕, "healthy, abundant"
康浩, "healthy, vast"
康洋, "healthy, ocean"
康博, "healthy, doctor"
康尋, "healthy, look for"
靖弘, "peaceful, vast"
靖広, "peaceful, wide"
靖寛, "peaceful, generosity"
靖裕, "peaceful, abundant"
靖浩, "peaceful, vast"
靖洋, "peaceful, ocean"
靖博, "peaceful, doctor"
靖尋, "peaceful, look for"
安弘, "tranquil, vast"
安広, "tranquil, wide"
安寛, "tranquil, generosity"
保弘, "preserve, vast"
保洋, "preserve,ocean"
保博, "preserve, doctor"
泰洋, "peaceful, ocean"
泰弘, "peaceful,vast"
泰博, "peaceful, doctor"
易尋, "divination, look for"
易大, "divination,big"
恭大, "respectful, big"

The name can also be written in hiragana やすひろ or katakana ヤスヒロ.

Notable people with the name

Arts
Yasuhiro Abe (安部 恭弘, born 1956), musician
Yasuhiro Fukushima (福嶋 康博, born 1947), founder of Enix
Yasuhiro Imagawa (今川 泰宏, born 1961), anime director
Yasuhiro Irie (入江 泰浩, born 1971), animator, character designer, and anime director
Yasuhiro Ishimoto (石元 泰博, 1921–2012), Japanese-American photographer
Yasuhiro Kanō (叶 恭弘, born 1970), manga artist
, Japanese footballer
Yasuhiro Kobayashi (小林 靖宏, born 1959), musician
Yasuhiro Morinaga (森永 泰弘, born 1980), Japanese composer and sound director
Yasuhiro Nightow (内藤 泰弘, born 1967), manga artist and game designer
Yasuhiro Sugihara (杉原 康弘, born 1969), better known as Sugizo, a musician
Yasuhiro Takato (高戸 靖広, born 1968), voice actor
Yasuhiro Takeda (武田 康廣, born 1957), anime director
Yasuhiro Takemoto (武本 康弘, 1972–2019), anime director
Yasuhiro Wada (和田 康宏), the creator of the Story of Seasons video game series
, Japanese footballer and manager
Yasuhiro Yoshiura (吉浦 康裕, born 1980), anime writer and director

Football
Yasuhiro Hato (波戸 康広, born 1976), footballer
Yasuhiro Higuchi (樋口 靖洋, born 1961), Japanese football manager
Yasuhiro Hiraoka (平岡 康裕, born 1986), footballer
Yasuhiro Kato (加藤 康弘, born 1986), Japanese footballer
Yasuhiro Nagahashi (長橋 康弘, born 1975), Japanese footballer
Yasuhiro Nomoto (野本 安啓, born 1983), Japanese footballer
Yasuhiro Okuyama (奥山 泰裕, born 1985), Japanese footballer
Yasuhiro Tanaka (footballer) (田中 泰裕, born 1984), Japanese footballer
, Japanese footballer
Yasuhiro Toyota (豊田 泰広, born 1976), former Japanese footballer
Yasuhiro Yamada (山田 泰寛, 1968–2013), Japanese footballer
Yasuhiro Yamakoshi (山腰 泰博, born 1985), Japanese footballer
Yasuhiro Yamamura (山村 泰弘, born 1976), Japanese footballer
Yasuhiro Yoshida (吉田 康弘, born 1969), footballer

Martial arts
Yasuhiro Awano (粟野 靖浩, born 1988), Japanese judoka
Yasuhiro Kido (城戸 康裕, born 1982), kickboxer and martial artist
Yasuhiro Konishi (小西 康裕, 1893–1983), Japanese karate teacher
Yasuhiro Urushitani (漆谷 康宏, born 1976), mixed martial artist
Yasuhiro Yamashita (山下 泰裕, born 1957), judo competitor

Politics
Yasuhiro Hanashi (葉梨 康弘, born 1959), politician
Yasuhiro Matsuda (松田 康博, born 1965), Japanese professor of politics
Yasuhiro Nakagawa (中川 泰宏, born 1951), politician
Yasuhiro Nakasone (中曽根 康弘, 1918–2019), politician
Yasuhiro Oe (大江 康弘, born 1945), politician
Yasuhiro Ozato (小里 泰弘, born 1958), politician
Yasuhiro Sonoda (園田 康博, born 1967), politician
Yasuhiro Tsuji (辻 泰弘, born 1955), politician

Sports
, Japanese cyclist
Yasuhiro Fueki (笛木 靖宏, born 1985), Japanese 400 metres runner
Yasuhiro Funatogawa (船渡川 育宏, born 1955), Japanese professional golfer
, Japanese alpine skier
Yasuhiro Inaba (稲葉 泰弘, born 1985), Japanese freestyle wrestler
, Japanese judoka
Yasuhiro Kaido (魁道 康弘, born 1975), former sumo wrestler
Yasuhiro Kojima (小島 泰弘, 1937–1999), former professional wrestler
, Japanese swimmer
Yasuhiro Nagahashi (長橋 康弘, born 1948), Japanese professional golfer
Yasuhiro Noguchi (野口 泰弘, born 1946), former volleyball player
, Japanese sport wrestler
Yasuhiro Sato (佐藤 康弘, born 1967), baseball player
, Japanese speed skater
Yasuhiro Suzuki (鈴木 康弘, born 1984), Japanese Olympic boxer
, Japanese baseball player
Yasuhiro Tanaka (baseball) (田中 靖洋, born 1987), Japanese baseball player
Yasuhiro Une (畝 康弘), former Paralympic wheelchair athlete
Yasuhiro Wada (Honda) (和田 康裕, born 1951), manager of Honda Racing F1

Other
 Yasuhiro Masuda (増田 康宏, born 1997), Japanese shogi player

Fictional characters
Yasuhiro Hagakure (葉隠 康比呂), in Danganronpa: Trigger Happy Havoc

Japanese masculine given names